Love + Fury is the sixth studio album by Canadian rock band, Headstones. It was the band's first album released after their hiatus. At a length of 33 minutes, it is the band's shortest album to date. The album was nominated for "Rock Album of the Year" at the 2014 Juno Awards.

Background
The first song from the album to be released was "Bin This Way for Years", which was released on the band's website on August 15, 2011 as the first single. The band released a music video for the song on October 28, 2011. The band announced the recording of their new album on October 18, 2012, and that the album would be funded by pledges from fans through PledgeMusic. On March 22, 2013, the entire album was made available to stream on PledgeMusic exclusively for pledgers of the album. The album's next single, "Long Way to Neverland", debuted on radio on CHTZ-FM on March 28. The single was released as a digital download on April 16.

Commercial performance
The album debuted at #7 on the Canadian Albums Chart. This is the highest position ever for a Headstones album on that chart. In its first week, the album sold 4,000 copies.

Track listing
All songs written by Headstones except where noted. Song titles are stylized on the album without spaces, capitalization or punctuation.

Personnel
Hugh Dillon - vocals, harmonica
Trent Carr - guitar, backup vocals
Tim White - bass
Dale Harrison - drums

Additional musicians
Steve Carr - piano (on "Long Way to Neverland" and "Midnight of This Life")
Osa Campbell - guitar (on "Astronaught")
Devin Robertson - additional background vocals (on "Change My Ways")
Vince Male - additional background vocals (on "Change My Ways")

References

2013 albums
Headstones (band) albums
Albums recorded at Noble Street Studios